"Tether" is a single by Swedish DJ and producer Eric Prydz. It is a reworked version of Scottish electronic band Chvrches's song of the same name. The song was released as a digital download on 16 February 2015. The song was written by Chvrches and produced by Eric Prydz. It peaked to number 107 on the UK Singles Chart.

Music video
A music video to accompany the release of "Tether" was first released onto YouTube on 19 February 2015 at a total length of three minutes and seventeen seconds.

Track listing

Chart performance

Release history

References

2015 songs
Eric Prydz songs